Long Peter Madsen is the debut album by the American jazz group David Becker Tribune, released in 1986.

Track listing

Personnel
 David Becker – guitar, keyboards
 Jim Donica – double bass, bass guitar
 Bruce Becker – drums, percussion

References

1986 albums